Danijela Štajnfeld is a Serbian award-winning actress and filmmaker, of Jewish origin. She rose to fame in Serbia with the 2005 film Ivko’s Feast. Štajnfeld is a two-time recipient of the Best Actress Award.

Štajnfeld expanded her career when she later moved to the U.S. She started working as a director with her debut film Hold Me Right, a documentary that focuses on sexual assault and its impact on survivors. Hold Me Right premiered at the Sarajevo Film Festival on August 18, 2020, and gained much acclaim for its sense of empowerment.

Originally, Štajnfeld did not intend to share her story, but only to give other people a platform to speak. Her story was included in the film after the rough cut was finished. Hold Me Right is a reflection of Štajnfeld’s journey of being a victim of sexual assault and the aftermath of it. In this film, she has not only highlighted her struggle but also included first-hand testimonies of other sexual assault survivors, but also the perpetrators, and the ripple effect of the tragedy enhanced by the culture of silence and indifference to the aftermath of trauma. On 22 March 2021, it was revealed that Štajnfeld accused Branislav Lečić, an actor and former Minister of Culture of Serbia, as her rapist.

Štajnfeld has also done stand-up in various comedy clubs in NYC.

Selected filmography

Television

Film

Theater

Awards
 Best actress of Belgrade Drama Theater for the role of Lena in “Disharmonija”
 Best actress at Serbian National Drama Festival “Joakim Vujic”, for the role of  Milena Pavlovic Barili in “Mesec u Plamenu”

Personal life
Štajnfeld lives and works in New York City.

References

University of Arts in Belgrade alumni
Living people
Serbian television actresses
1984 births